Vittorio Barazzotto (born 20 November 1958 in Biella) is an Italian politician.

He is a member of the Democratic Party and he served as Mayor of Biella from 28 June 2004 to 8 June 2009.

He served as councillor at the Regional Council of Piedmont from 2014 to 2019.

See also
2004 Italian local elections
List of mayors of Biella

References

External links
 
 

1958 births
Living people
Mayors of Biella
University of Turin alumni
Members of the Regional Council of Piedmont
Italian Republican Party politicians
Democracy is Freedom – The Daisy politicians
Democratic Party (Italy) politicians
20th-century Italian politicians
21st-century Italian politicians